Alium or Alion was a fortified town in the district of Acroreia in ancient Elis, on the borders of Arcadia. Diodorus Siculus writes that the Spartans, under command of Pausanias of Sparta, marched against Elis with 4,000 men in 402 BCE, and that the towns of Opus, Alium, Eupagium, Thraustus, and Lasion were subdued. Xenophon mentions an Arcadian raid into Elis and took several towns of Acroreia around 365 BCE.

References

Populated places in ancient Elis
Former populated places in Greece
Lost ancient cities and towns